Michael Lam Wai-Leung is a former Hong Kong film actor. He has appeared in numerous films, in several of which he has played the lead role. He first appeared in the film The Night Rider.

Lam took his first lead role in the Hong Kong-Singapore co-produced film Bugis Street, made in 1995 and directed by award-winning director Yonfan, where he played the role of Meng.

Filmography
 The Night Rider (1992)     
 From Zero to Hero (1994)     
 He & She (1994) ... Michael, one of Kai's boyfriends 
 In the Heat of Summer (1994) ... gangster 
 Crystal Fortune Run (1994) ... Hot Dog 
 Organized Crime & Triad Bureau (1994) ... OCTB member 
 Let's Go Slam Dunk (1994) ... King Kong 
 The Final Option (1994) ... Ching 
 Fait Accompli (1994) ... Chun Ming 
 Touches of Love (1994)     
 Ten Brothers (1995) ... Rubber Four / Snake Skinned Four 
 Bugis Street (1995)     
 Highway Man (1995)     
 Thanks for Your Love (1996) ... [cameo] gay-lo on the street 
 Ah Kam (1996) ... Scarface 
 War of the Under World (1996) ... Lei Jia Bao 
 Sexy and Dangerous (1996) ... Lurcher's man 
 Those Were the Days (1996) ... Norman 
 All's Well, End's Well '97 (1997) ... Muscle 
 The Hunted Hunter (1997) ... Shek Chue 
 Love Cruise (1997) ... Leon 
 Young and Dangerous 4 (1997) ... Dinosaur 
 The Love and Sex of the Eastern Hollywood (1998) ... Mike/Patrick 
 A Hero Never Dies (1998) ... Bodyguard 
 The Group (1998)     
 Casino (1998) ... Tai Hung 
 Magnificent Team (1998) ... Two Stroke 
 Bishonen (1998) ... Sex-buyer 
 Hong Kong Night Club (1998) ... Black Hand's thug 
 Untouchable Maniac (2000) ... Nick 
 The Blood Rules (2000) ... Cocky customer at car showroom 
 Women From Mars (2002) ... Chu Da Tou 
 Dragon Loaded 2003 (2003) ... "Swimming" demonstrator 
 Super Model (2004) ... model at disco 
 Undercover (2007)

References

Hong Kong male film actors
Hong Kong male actors
Living people
Year of birth missing (living people)